Marlene Needham is a Jamaican former cricketer who played as a right-handed batter. She appeared in nine One Day Internationals for the West Indies between 1993 and 1997. She played domestic cricket for Jamaica.

Needham made her debut for the West Indies at the 1993 World Cup in England. She appeared in five of her team's seven matches, but scored only 26 runs. Needham was retained in the West Indian squad for the 1997 World Cup in India, but again struggled for form, making only 14 runs in four matches. Against Denmark, she made the highest score of her One Day International (ODI) career – nine runs from 18 balls. Despite finishing with an ODI career batting average of just 4.44, Needham was dismissed for a duck only once, against New Zealand at the 1997 World Cup.

References

External links
 
 

Living people
Date of birth missing (living people)
Year of birth missing (living people)
West Indian women cricketers
West Indies women One Day International cricketers
West Indian women cricket captains
Jamaican women cricketers